The Collector is a 1997 Finnish drama film directed by Auli Mantila. The film was selected as the Finnish entry for the Best Foreign Language Film at the 70th Academy Awards, but was not accepted as a nominee.

Cast
 Leea Klemola as Eevi
 Elina Hurme as Ami
 Rea Mauranen as Anja
 Henriikka Salo as Helena
 Robin Svartström as Jusu

See also
 List of submissions to the 70th Academy Awards for Best Foreign Language Film
 List of Finnish submissions for the Academy Award for Best Foreign Language Film

References

External links
 

1997 films
1997 drama films
Finnish drama films
1990s Finnish-language films